Barwa Group is a real estate company based in Doha, Qatar. Established in 2005, it is listed on the Qatar Exchange, with 45% of its shares held by the Qatar Investment Authority, via its Qatari Diar subsidiary. It is primarily active in real estate development and related financial services. It is Qatar's largest real estate group. It is chaired by Salah bin Ghanim Al Ali.

Projects

Mesaieed

Mesaimeer
In February 2009, a development project was launched in Mesaimeer, a district of Al Rayyan by Barwa Group. Entailed in the project are 1,000-capacity residential housing units, a supermarket, a nursery, and a mosque; all within a gated compound.

Barwa Al Baraha

Barwa Group launched a project to construct Barwa Al Baraha, a city designed for laborers, in the Al Wakrah (municipality) at a budget of around $1.1 billion. The project was completed in 2010.

Madinat Al Mawater 
The Madinat Al Mawater project is located close to Rawdat Rashid area and Salwa Road. The project holds built-up area of around 167,072 square meters, which includes apartments, used-car lots, shops and workshops. The completion of phase one of the project was announced in March 2017.

Other 
Barwa has been a sponsor of the Spanish motorsport Addax Team.

References

External links
 

Companies based in Doha
Real estate companies of Qatar
Real estate companies established in 2005
2005 establishments in Qatar
Companies listed on the Qatar Stock Exchange